Supinfocom (école SUPérieure d'INFOrmatique de COMmunication, roughly University of Communication Science) is a computer graphics university with campuses in Valenciennes, Arles (France) and Pune (India).

History
Founded in 1988 in Valenciennes, the school offers a five-year course leading to a diploma of digital direction (certified Level I). A second campus in Arles opened in 2000, while a third one opened in 2008 in Pune, India.

In November 2007, the school was ranked #1 worldwide by the American magazine "3D World" with criteria such as the distribution of student films and prizes in festivals around the world.

Curriculum 

The curriculum includes:
 Two years of preparatory courses (design and applied art, perspective, film analysis, video, color, 2D animation, art history, sculpture, communication, English);
 Three years of specialization in computer graphics (3D software, screenplay, storyboards, animation, compositing, 3D production, sound, editing).

The final year of study is devoted to the team-based production of a short film in CG.

Until the class of 2007 entered, there were only two years of specialization courses; there are now three.

See also 
:Category:Supinfocom alumni

External links 
 Official site of Supinfocom Valenciennes
 Official site of DSK Supinfocom Pune

Art schools in France
Engineering universities and colleges in France
Animation schools in France
Animation schools in India
Engineering colleges in Pune
Digital media education
3D computer graphics
Education in Valenciennes
Universities in Provence-Alpes-Côte d'Azur
Buildings and structures in Arles
Universities in Hauts-de-France
Educational institutions established in 1988
1988 establishments in France
2008 establishments in Maharashtra